Kan Cheong Dunn (February 28, 1925 – April 19, 2014) was a Taiwanese ambassador of Cantonese descent and former naval officer of the ROC Navy.

Career 
He joined the Chinese Navy and received additional training at the U.S. Naval Training School in Miami in communications and anti-submarine warfare. 
He was part of the Chinese crew that sailed former US Navy ships from Miami backed to China during the final days of World War II. 
As the war ended, he entered the Chinese Naval Academy and graduated in 1949.
In 1950 he was Secretary to Admiral Kwei Yung-ching, Commander-in-Chief of the Republic of China Navy. 
In 1952, he served in the Office of the President as Secretary to the Chief of Staff.
In 1953, he qualified in the Diplomat Senior Grade Examinations.
In 1954 he became assistant in the Ministry of Foreign Affairs (MOFA) in Taipei.
From 1958 to 1960 he was Vice Consul in Davao City, Republic of Philippines.
From 1960 to 1964 he was Vice Consul in San Francisco.
In 1964, he was Consul in Los Angeles.
From 1967 to 1970 he was Consul in New York-
From 1970 to 1972 he had Execuartur as Consul General in Chicago.
From 1972 to 1973 he was Deputy Director-General of MOFA Bureau of Consular Affairs.
In 1973 he became exequartur as Consul General in Houston.
From 1977 to 1978 he was Director-General of MOFA Department of General Affairs.
From 1978 to 1979 he was the last Consul General in New York City.
From 1979 to 1985 he became Director-General of Coordination Council for North American Affairs in New York (later Taipei Economic and Cultural Office in New York, TECO-New York) after the diplomatic recognition from the United States was severed.  During his tenure he also represented Taiwan as quasi ambassador next the Headquarters of the United Nations.
From 1986 to 1987 he was Vice Chairperson of MOFA Research and Planning Committee in Taipei.
In 1988, he was appointed Representative of the Trade Mission of the Republic of China in Monrovia. 
On  when the government in Liberia swapped the diplomatic recognition from the government in Beijing to the government in Taipei, he became ambassador to Liberia.
 He stayed for three month in the First Liberian Civil War
On Sept. 25, 1990 Dunn left the ROC embassy in Monrovia and escaped to the Ivory Coast, bringing his secretary and 15 mainland Chinese with him.
In 1997, he retired from public service.

References

1925 births
2014 deaths
Ambassadors of China to Liberia
Ambassadors of the Republic of China
Taiwanese expatriates in the United States
Taiwanese expatriates in the Philippines